Sirajganj is a city in north-western Bangladesh on the right bank of the Jamuna River. It is the administrative headquarters of Sirajganj District, and with a population of 167,200 is the fourteenth most populous city in the country. It is the city where Pakistani Brig. Jehanzeb Arbab looted the bank back in 1971 during Bangladesh liberation  war. It was once a principal centre of the jute trade.

History 
During British rule, Sirajganj was a town in the Pabna District of Eastern Bengal and Assam. Its location on the right bank of the Jamuna River or main stream of the Brahmaputra was a six-hour journey by steamer from the railway terminal at Goalundo. It was the chief river mart for jute in northern Bengal, with several jute presses. The jute mills were closed after the 1897 Assam earthquake. The population according to the 1901 census of India was 23,114.

Demographics 

According to the 2011 Bangladesh census, Sirajganj city had 37,442 households and a population of 167,200. The literacy rate (age 7 and over) was 62.2%, compared to the national average of 51.8%.

Religion 

Muslims make up 90.21% of the population, while Hindus are 9.68% of the population. The Hindu population has remained relatively constant while the Muslim population has constantly increased. The remaining 0.11% people follow other religions, mainly Christianity.

Points of interest 

 Jamuna Bridge
 Elliott Bridge
 Sirajganj Hard Point
 Jamuna Eco Park
 Rasel Park
 House of Syed Ismail Hossain Siraji

Transport 
In the later half of the 19th century, Sirajganj was an important river port. It was the main collection point for jute produced in northern Bengal and western Mymensingh. After the 1897 Assam earthquake, which damaged infrastructure and shifted the course of the river farther from the city, its significance declined. It was eclipsed by Narayanganj, another river port, which also had a rail connection.

Not until 1915 was Sirajganj connected to the railway network, with the opening of the Sara-Sirajganj line. As of 2022, there is an Intercity train to Dhaka six days a week.

East-west national highway N405 passes just south of the city.

Education 
There are two medical schools in the city, the public Shaheed M. Monsur Ali Medical College, established in 2014, and the private North Bengal Medical College & Hospital, established in 2000. As of May 2019, they are respectively allowed to admit 51 and 85 students annually.

There are eight colleges in the city. They include Sirajganj Government College, founded in 1940, Islamia Government College (1887), and Government Rashidazzoha Womens College.

According to Banglapedia, B.L. Government High School, founded in 1869, Jnandayini High School (1884), Saleha Ishaque Government Girls' High School, and Victoria High School (1898) are notable secondary schools.

Notable people 

Abdul Momin Talukdar (1929–1995) was a Bangladeshi Awami League politician, lawyer and former member of parliament and the former Deputy Minister of Local Government, Rural Development and Cooperative.
 Jadav Chandra Chakravarti, mathematician, constructed a building in the Dhanbandi neighborhood in 1901.
 Zahid Hasan, actor, was born in Sirajganj in 1967.
 Mazharul Islam, poet and folklorist, completed his Higher Secondary Certificate from Sirajganj College in 1947.
 Abdul Latif Mirza, freedom fighter and member of parliament, died in Sirajganj in 2007.
 Ismail Hossain Siraji, poet and novelist, lived in Sirajganj.
 Haimanti Sukla, singer, was born in what is now the Munshi Meherullah Road area of Sirajganj.
 Professor Talukdar Mohammad Tauhidul Iqbal, Department of Horticulture, Hajee Mohammad Danesh Science & Technology University

References

External links 

 http://www.sirajganj.gov.bd/

Populated places in Rajshahi Division
Pourashavas of Bangladesh